Sala Bolognese is a comune (municipality) in the Metropolitan City of Bologna in the Italian region Emilia-Romagna, located about  northwest of Bologna.

The municipality of Sala Bolognese is composed by the frazioni Padulle (housing the municipality seat), Sala, Osteria Nuova, Bonconvento and Bagno di Piano.

It is home of the Romanesque Pieve of Santa Maria Annunziata and San Biagio, at Sala, built in 1096.

References

External links
 Official website

Cities and towns in Emilia-Romagna